Michael Christopher Payne  is a British theoretical physicist, working in the field of computational physics and theoretical condensed matter physics at the University of Cambridge.

He is the creator of first principles total energy pseudopotential code CASTEP and has been involved in the development of the linear scaling code ONETEP.
He was the 23rd most highly cited Physical Scientist in the UK between 1990 and 1999, and has published more than 250 papers which have had over 22,000 citations.

He was awarded the 1996 Maxwell Medal and Prize by the Institute of Physics and gave the 1998 Mott Lecture. He was elected Fellow of the Royal Society in 2008 and awarded the Swan Medal and Prize by the Institute of Physics in 2014. In 2011 he was made an honorary fellow of the Institute of Physics.
He was head of Theory of Condensed Matter (TCM) group in the Cavendish Laboratory at the University of Cambridge until 2013, succeeded by Benjamin Simons.

References

External links
 Mike Payne, TCM, Cavendish Laboratory, University of Cambridge.

Fellows of the Royal Society
Fellows of Pembroke College, Cambridge
Maxwell Medal and Prize recipients
Year of birth missing (living people)
Living people
Computational physicists